Ebenezer Donkor, popularly known as Katawere (1938 – 12 November 2016), was a Ghanaian actor known primarily for his role in the Ghanaian television program Efiewura.

Career
Donkor had been in the acting career for over thirty years, starring in several dramatic television series throughout the 1990s. He appeared in Ghana Commercial Bank advert in the 1990s.  He also starred in over twenty Kumawood films. Donkor died on 14 November 2016 at Opoku Ware Hospital in Cantonments, Accra, having battled an undisclosed illness for the previous two years.

Selected filmography

As actor

References

External links
 

Ghanaian male film actors
Ghanaian male television actors
1938 births
2016 deaths